Kirbyville may refer to:

 Kirbyville, Texas
 Kirbyville, Missouri
 Kirbyville, Pennsylvania